Vadim Vyacheslavovich Larionov (born 22 October 1996) is a Russian former football player.

Club career
He made his debut in the Russian Professional Football League for FC Sibir-2 Novosibirsk on 22 April 2015 in a game against FC Metallurg Novokuznetsk.

References

External links
 Profile by Russian Professional Football League
 
 

1996 births
People from Belovo, Kemerovo Oblast
Living people
Russian footballers
Association football forwards
Russian expatriate footballers
Expatriate footballers in Belarus
PFC CSKA Moscow players
FC Irtysh Omsk players
FC Sibir Novosibirsk players
FC Novokuznetsk players
FC Minsk players
Belarusian Premier League players
FC Olimp-Dolgoprudny players
Sportspeople from Kemerovo Oblast